Dimethyl(trifluoromethylthio)arsine is an arsenical compound developed by the United States military chemical weapon research program, which is described as "one of the most potent lung irritants known."

See also
 Cacodyl
 Cacodyl cyanide
 Diphenylchlorarsine
 Lewisite
 Methyldichloroarsine
 Tetrachlorodinitroethane
 Bis(trifluoromethyl) disulfide

References

Arsenical vesicants
Arsenic(III) compounds
Vomiting agents
Trifluoromethylthio compounds
Cacodyl compounds